Steel River was a Canadian rock group formed in Toronto, which performed primarily during the 1970s.

Background
Starting in 1965 as a part-time Toronto R&B club band called The Toronto Shotgun, Steel River became a full-time band in 1969. The lineup consisted of singer John Dudgeon, keyboardist Bob Forrester, bassist Rob Cockell, guitarist Tony Dunning,  and drummers Ray Angrove and Dennis Watson. Greg Hambleton signed them to his then-label Tuesday Records, which released their first single "Ten Pound Note", and was written with the assistance of A Passing Fancy's Jay Telfer. The single hit the Top 10 in Canada. It finished in Canada at #79 for the year.

Career
In December 1970, Steel River and Tuesday Records labelmates Madrigal were ready to tour Quebec and the Maritimes.  Also they were to appear in a CKFH promoted charity-related concert that was held at Massey Hall on the 20th. Other artists on the list were Ronnie Hawkins, Everyday People, Madrigal and Tommy Graham. 

In 1971, the band released a follow-up LP on Evolution Records. A single, "Southbound Train", was released through Quality Records and included a toy train in the promotional package.

They continued touring internationally until they disbanded in 1974. Before breaking up, however, they went on a 14-state tour in the United States.

Four out of five of the original members reunited briefly in 1980, and released a single, "Armoured Car".

In 1983, vocalist John Dudgeon went on to release a solo track entitled "Put My Arms Around You", which received extensive airplay on CKFM (99.9) and other stations in Canada and the US.

In 2013 and 2014, two of Steel River's albums, A Better Road and a remixed Weighin' Heavy, were reissued on producer Greg Hambleton's revived Axe Records label.

Discography

Singles
 1970 - "Ten Pound Note" / "Momma Pie Blues" (Tuesday) GH-101 [#5 CAN]
 1971 - "Walk by the River" / "If You Let Her Know" (Tuesday) GH-105
 1971 - "Southbound Train (Stand Up)" / "A Lie" (Tuesday) GH-110 [#28 CAN]
 1971 - "Mexican Lady" / "Joyful Judy" (Tuesday) GH-113
 1974 - "Just Remember" / "Lazin' Children" (Axe) AXE-14
 1980 - "Armoured Car" / "Hold Me Close" (Axe) AXE-60
 1980 - "We Want You to Love Us" / "Keep Movin' On" (Axe) AXE-61

Albums
 1970 - Weighin' Heavy (Tuesday) GHL-1000
 1971 - A Better Road (Tuesday) GHL-1003
 1979 - Armoured Car (Axe Records Limited) AXM-1001
 2014 - A Better Road [Re-issue] (Axe Records) A534
 2015 - Weighin' Heavy [Re-issue] (Axe Records) A536
 2015 - Armoured Car [Re-issue] (Axe Records digital download) DL-A540

Compilation tracks
 1990 - "Ten Pound Note" on Made in Canada: Volume One - The Early Years (BMG) KCD1-7156

References

External links and sources

 Discogs: Steel River
 45Cat: Steel River

Musical groups established in 1969
Musical groups disestablished in 1974
Musical groups reestablished in 1980
Musical groups from Toronto
Canadian rock music groups
1969 establishments in Ontario
1974 disestablishments in Ontario
1980 establishments in Ontario
Axe Records artists
Tuesday Records artists